SS Ajax was a cargo steamship that was built in Germany in 1923 as Elbe. In 1927 she was renamed twice, first to Ceuta and then to Ajax.

A series of German shipping companies owned the ship until 1927, when a Dutch company bought her. A Luftwaffe air raid sank her in the English Channel in 1940. Her wreck off the Isle of Wight is now a destination for wreck diving.

Building

Peacetime career
Kirsten Adolf & Co registered Elbe in Hamburg. In 1924 Rochling, Menzell & Co bought her. In 1927 the Oldenburg-Portugiesische Dampfschiffs-Rhederei (OPDR) bought Elbe and renamed her Ceuta. Later in 1927, OPDR sold Ceuta to the Koninklijke Nederlandse Stoomboot-Maatschappij (KNSM), which renamed her Ajax and registered her in Amsterdam.

Under KNSM ownership Ajax had the Dutch code letters NBTJ until 1933−34, when they were superseded by the call sign PCFQ.

Second World War
On 10 May 1940 Germany invaded the Netherlands. On 31 July Ajax left Falmouth, Cornwall in Convoy CE 8, which reached the Thames Estuary off Southend on 5 August. On 7 August Ajax left Southend with Convoy CW 9 to head west down the English Channel. CW 9 was code named Peewit. It comprised 26 cargo ships with no naval escort.

German Freya radar detected CW 9 as it passed through the Strait of Dover. Four E-boats attacked the convoy, sinking four ships. As CW 9 passed south of St Catherine's Point on the Isle of Wight, Junkers Ju 87 dive bombers and Messerschmitt Bf 109 fighter aircraft attacked. RAF Fighter Command counter-attacked, but at 0910 hrs two Ju 87s and a Bf 109 hit the forward part of Ajax with three bombs. She sank within five minutes, and four members of her crew were killed.

Her stern is broken up but her bow, boilers, engine and helm can all be identified. Her wreck is now a recreational dive site.

References

Bibliography

External links

1923 ships
Maritime incidents in August 1940
Merchant ships of Germany
Ships built in Hamburg
Ships sunk by German aircraft
Steamships of Germany
Steamships of the Netherlands
World War II merchant ships of the Netherlands
World War II shipwrecks in the English Channel
Wreck diving sites in England